The molecular formula C18H18O5 (molar mass: 314.33 g/mol, exact mass: 314.115424 u) may refer to:
 Flavokavain A, a flavokavain found in the kava plant
 7-Hydroxy-2,3,4,8-tetramethoxyphenanthrene, a phenanthrene found in the rhizome of Dioscorea communis